Echinosaura is a genus of lizards, called commonly the spined tegus, in the family Gymnophthalmidae. The genus is endemic to Central America and South America.

Geographic range and habitat
Species of Echinosaura occur in tropical rainforests of Panama and South America.

Description
Spined tegu lizards are normally brown in color and have spines on the head, torso, and tail.

Species
8 species are recognised:
Echinosaura brachycephala 
Echinosaura centralis 
Echinosaura fischerorum 
Echinosaura horrida  - rough teiid
Echinosaura keyi  - Key tegu
Echinosaura orcesi 
Echinosaura palmeri  - Palmer's teiid
Echinosaura panamensis  - Panama teiid

Notes

Further reading
Boulenger GA (1890). "First Report on Additions to the Lizard Collection in the British Museum (Natural History)". Proc. Zool. Soc. London 1890: 77-86 + Plates VIII-XI. (Echinosaura, new genus, pp. 82–83; E. horrida, new species, p. 83 + Plate X, figures 1, 1a, 1b).

 
Reptiles of South America
Lizard genera
Taxa named by George Albert Boulenger